Vino is a lyrical rock album released by Draco Rosa in 2008 under Phantom Vox and a follow-up to Vagabundo. It was first published during the summer of 2007 under the alternate title of El Teatro del Absurdo in certain territories.

Background
Draco terminated all contractual liaisons with Sony Music soon after the release of Mad Love. This freedom gave way to Vino, his first Spanish album since the release of Vagabundo in 1996.

Track listing

All songs by Draco Rosa, excepted where noted.

"Todo Es Vino"
"Te Fumaré"
"Es la Guerra"
"Sueño Contigo"
"Aleluya" (Leonard Cohen)
"Todo Marcha Bien"
"Desnudo (Happy)"
"Horizonte"
"Bosque de los Números"
"Hasta la Victoria"
"One Too Many Mornings"  (Bob Dylan) 
"Roto por Ti"
"Mensaje de Paz"
"Luchar Por Ella"

2008 albums
Draco Rosa albums